The Gaberbocchus Press was a London publishing house founded in 1948 by the artist couple Stefan and Franciszka Themerson. Alongside the Themersons, the other directors of the Press were the translator Barbara Wright and the artist Gwen Barnard who also illustrated a number of the company's publications.

The name is the Latinized form of Jabberwocky and the earliest books were printed at their home on King's Road, Chelsea, London and in 1956 they moved to 42a Formosa Street in Maida Vale, London. In 1959 the basement of their office was turned into the Gaberbocchus Common Room, a meeting place for those interested in art and science. They showed films, plays and held poetry readings.

Over its 31 years the Gaberbocchus Press published over sixty titles, including their own works and those by Oswell Blakeston, the Irish poet George Henry Perrott Buchanan, Christian Dietrich Grabbe, Hugo Manning, Heinrich Heine, Raymond Queneau, C. H. Sisson, Stevie Smith, Anatol Stern, Kenneth Tynan, Alfred Jarry, Kurt Schwitters (Themerson wrote Kurt Schwitters in England in 1958), and Bertrand Russell. Alfred Jarry's Ubu Roi became one of its most celebrated titles and was published in many editions. The National Art Library owns 20 of their titles. Yearly greeting cards were sent to various contacts in the publishing business and a large set of these have been preserved at the National Library of Poland as Gaberbocchus: some of the old favourites.

The content of the Themersons' own books were often experiments with language and visual effects. The form was tailored for each publication to support and complement the content, using self-produced paper and other techniques.
The couple sold their publishing company in 1979 to the Dutch publishing house Uitgeverij De Harmonie, which was also making experimental visual publications throughout the 1970s.

Books published by Gaberbocchus Press

 Stefan Themerson. Jankel Adler - an Artist seen from one of many possible angles. 1948
 Aesop, The Eagle & the Fox & The Fox & the Eagle: two semantically symmetrical versions and a revised application, (devised by Stefan Themerson). Illustrated by Franciszka Themerson. 1949
 Hugo Manning. The Crown and The Fable. A poetic sequence. 1950
 Stefan Themerson & Barbara Wright. Mr Rouse builds his House. 1950
 (Translation of a story for children) Pan Tom buduje dom by Stefan Themerson, with 122 drawings by Franciszka. (Original Polish version published in Warsaw, 1938).
 Stefan Themerson. Wooff Wooff, or Who Killed Richard Wagner?. A novella with drawings by Franciszka Themerson. 1951
 Alfred Jarry. Ubu Roi. Drama in Five acts followed by the Song of Disembraining. First English translation and preface by Barbara Wright. Drawings by Franciszka Themerson. 1951
 Hugo Manning. This Room before Sunrise. Prose poem. 1952
 Bertrand Russell. The Good Citizen's Alphabet. An adventure in wicked humour. Illustrated by Franciszka Themerson. 1953
 C.H. Sisson. An Asiatic Romance. A satirical novel. 1953
 Stefan Themerson. Professor Mmaa's Lecture, An insect novel. Preface by Bertrand Russell. Illustrated by Franciszka Themerson. 1953
 Stefan Themerson. The Adventures of Peddy Bottom. A story illustrated by Franciszka Themerson. 1954
 John Conrad Russell. Abandon Spa Hot Springs. With two drawings by the author. 1954. Black series no.1
 Raymond Queneau. The Trojan Horse & At the Edge of the Forest. Translated by Barbara Wright. 1954. Black series no.2
 Franciszka Themerson. The Way it Walks. A book of cartoons. 1954. Black series no.3
 Eugene Walter. Monkey Poems. Illustrated with 8 engravings of monkeys. 1954
 Christian-Dietrich Grabbe. Comedy, Satire, Irony and Deeper Meaning. Drama in five Acts written by Grabbe in 1822, with drawings and collages by his contemporary Dr S. Willoughby. 1955
 Gwen Barnard. The Shapes of the River. A sequence of colour monoprints of the London Thames by Gwen Barnard with Comments by Eugene Walter. 1955.
 C.H. Sisson. Versions and Perversions of Heine. English version of 14 political poems by Heinrich Heine. 1955. Black series no.4
 Pol-Dives (Vladimir Polissadiv). The Song of Bright Misery/Le poème de la misère claire.36 illustrations by Pol-Dives from magic lantern slides, accompanied by an explanatory parallel text in French and in English. Translation by Barbara Wright. Preface by Stefan Themerson. 1955. Black series nos. 5-6
 Patrick Fetherston. Day Off. A story with drawings by Patrick Hayman. 1955. Black series no.7
 The Gaberbocchus Independent. Broadsheet about Gaberbocchus with extracts from books and reviews. 1955
 Stefan Themerson. factor T. An essay on human nature and another on beliefs, concluded with the Semantic Sonata and an index. 1956. Black series nos.8-9s.
 J.H. Sainmont. (pseudonym of ), translated by Stanley Chapman.  Camille Renault (1866-1954): World-maker. 1957. Black series no.10
 Axel Stern. Metaphysical Reverie, 1956. drawings by Jean Krillé . Black series no.11
 Beverly Jackson Huddleston. A Line in Time. Cartoons. 1957. Black series no.12
 The First Dozen by various authors. (The Black Series in a single volume) 1958
 Raymond Queneau. Exercises in Style. The story of a minor brawl in a Paris bus, told in 99 different ways. First English translation by Barbara Wright. 1958
 Stevie Smith. Some are more human than others. A sketchbook with handwritten comments and drawings by the author.''' 1958
 Stefan Themerson. Kurt Schwitters in England: 1940-1948. The first publication of Schwitters' English poems and prose, written during the last 8 years of his life. 1958
 George Buchanan. Bodily Responses. Poetry. 1958
 George Buchanan. Green Seacoast. Autobiographical essay. 1959
 James Laughlin. Confidential Report & other poems (Selected Poems in some copies). 1959
 Harold Lang & Kenneth Tynan. The Quest for Corbett. Written for radio. Presentation by Franciszka Themerson. 1960
 Edmund  Héafod (pseud. Osias Bain). Gimani. Prose journal. 1961
 Eugene Walter. Singerie-Songerie. A masque on the subject of Lyric Mode with illustrations by Zev. 1961
 George Buchanan. Conversations with Strangers. Poems and notes. 1961
 Oswell Blakeston. The Night's Moves. A thriller. 1961
 Stefan Themerson. Cardinal Pölätüo. Novel. 1961
 Raoul Hausmann & Kurt Schwitters. Pin and the story of Pin. Edited and introduced by Jasia Reichardt. 1962
 Anatol Stern. Europa. Facsimile reproduction of one of the first Polish futurist poems, 1925. Translated from the Polish by Michael Horovitz and Stefan Themerson. illustrated with stills from the Themersons' lost film of 1932. 1962
 Bertrand Russell. History of the World in Epitome (For use in Martian infant schools). 1962
 Franciszka and Stefan Themerson. Semantic Divertissements. 1962
 Oswell Blakeston. Fingers. Prose with drawings by Herbert Jones. 1964
 Stefan Themerson. Bayamus and the Theatre of Semantic Poetry. A semantic novel. 1965
 George Buchanan. Morning Papers. 1965
 Stefan Themerson. Tom Harris. Novel in two parts. 1967
 Patrick Fetherston. Three Days After Blasphemies. Poetry. 1967
 Stefan Themerson. Apollinaire's Lyrical Ideograms. 1968
 Franciszka Themerson. Traces of Living. Drawings. 1969
 Bertrand Russell. The Good Citizen's Alphabet. An adventure in wicked humour. Illustrated by Franciszka Themerson & History of the World in Epitome (For use in Martian infant schools). published in one volume.
 Stefan Themerson. Special Branch. A novel. 1972
 Stefan Themerson. St. Francis and the Wolf of Gubbio, or Brother Francis' Lamb Chops. An opera. 1972
 Cozette de Charmoy. The True Life of Sweeney Todd. 1973
 Stefan Themerson. Logic, Labels & Flesh. 11 essays. 1974
 David Miller. South London Mix. Poetic prose. 1975
 Stefan Themerson. On Semantic Poetry. 1975
 Henri Chopin. The Cosmographical Lobster. A poetic novel. 1976
 Stefan Themerson. General Piesc, or the Case of the Forgotten Mission. A short novel. 1976
 Stefan Themerson. The Urge to Create Visions. Essay on film. 1983
 Stefan Themerson. The Mystery of the Sardine. A novel. 1986
 Stefan Themerson. Hobson's Island. A novel. 1988
 Nicholas Wadley, ed. The Drawings of Franciszka Themerson, 1991
 Stefan Themerson. Collected Poems''. 1997

References

External links
  official website
Archive website in UK

Book publishing companies of the United Kingdom
British companies established in 1948
Publishing companies established in 1948
Publishing companies disestablished in 1979
Publishing companies based in London
1948 establishments in England
1979 disestablishments in England
King's Road, Chelsea, London